The 1960–61 Rugby Union County Championship was the 61st edition of England's premier rugby union club competition at the time.

Cheshire won the competition for the second time after defeating Devon in the replayed final.

Final

Final Replay

See also
 English rugby union system
 Rugby union in England

References

Rugby Union County Championship
County Championship (rugby union) seasons